V. Sue Cleveland High School, or Cleveland High School (CHS), is a public senior high school of the Rio Rancho Public Schools. It is located in north-western Rio Rancho, New Mexico.  V. Sue Cleveland was established in 2009, due to overcrowding at Rio Rancho High School. Enrollment at the school stands at approximately 2600.  It is the only school in New Mexico named for a currently-serving school board official, having been named after the current superintendent of Rio Rancho Public School.

The Mascot of CHS is the Storm, their colors are: Electric blue, Silver and white.

Athletics
CHS competes in the New Mexico Activities Association (NMAA), as a class 5A school in District 1. In 2014, the NMAA realigned the state's schools into six classifications and adjusted district boundaries.

Notable alumni

  Nico Muniz - former professional soccer player

Footnotes

External links 
 Cleveland High School

Public high schools in New Mexico
Rio Rancho, New Mexico
Schools in Sandoval County, New Mexico
2009 establishments in New Mexico